CybAero is an aerospace company industry based in Sweden. CybAero develops and manufactures remotely piloted helicopters. The company is a public company traded on First North on Stockholm Stock Exchange.

In June 2018, the firm filed for bankruptcy.

History
The company was founded in 2003, based on research initiated in 1992 by FOA (later FOI) and Linköping University. The company develops, manufactures and sells unmanned aerial vehicles systems consisting of helicopters, ground stations, sensors and data links.

CybAero is headquartered at Mjärdevi Science Park in the Nordic region's leading aeronautics town, Linköping. Research and development is conducted in part with other companies and research institutions. CybAero has approximately 55 employees and is listed on the NASDAQ OMX First North since 2007.

Milestones
 On January 8, 2008 the APID 55 unmanned helicopter performed the first flight of a UAV in the capital of Sweden, Stockholm.
 In February, 2008 the first flight with the NRL Cybaero joint venture UAV called Vantage was performed near Washington DC.
 In October, 2009 CybAero signed a teaming agreement with Spanish defense and security group Indra Sistemas.

Remotely Piloted Aircraft Systems (RPAS)
The main products are
 APID One

References

External links
 

Aerospace companies of Sweden
Defence companies of Sweden
Companies established in 2003
2003 establishments in Sweden
Helicopter manufacturers
Companies based in Östergötland County